Timur Sabirov (uzb. Timur Sobirov, ru: Тимур Сабиров born January 1, in 1986) - is a Vice President of Bodybuilding and Fitness Federation of Uzbekistan, Executive Council Members And Patrons of ABBF (Asian Bodybuilding And Physique Sports Federation) and a former professional bodybuilder.

Biography 
Timur Sabirov was born in Tashkent, Uzbekistan. He started his bodybuilding career in early 2000. He is an absolute champion of Uzbekistan in 2007 and 2008 in bodybuilding, a winner of the open championship of Kazakhstan in 2008. After ending his professional career in bodybuilding he has been selected as a Vice President of Bodybuilding and Fitness Federation of Uzbekistan

Sports Career 

After ending professional career in bodybuilding he has been selected as Vice President of Bodybuiling and Fitness Federation of Uzbekistan. He started organaizing of major sporting events,including World Cup Power Extreme 2011 and 2012, bodybuilding show-tournament “Night of Champions – 2011, 49th Asian Bodybuilding and Physique Championships, 12th World Bodybuilding and Physique Sports Championships and many other national tournaments.

Personal life 
Sabirov  is married and he has 3 daughters.

See also 
Uzbekistan Bodybuilding and Fitness Federation

References 

1986 births
Uzbekistani bodybuilders
Male bodybuilders
Sportspeople from Tashkent
Living people